Perichasma is a genus of flowering plants belonging to the family Menispermaceae.

Its native range is Africa.

Species:
 Perichasma laetificata Miers 
 Perichasma miersii Kundu & S.Guha

References

Menispermaceae
Menispermaceae genera